Bacterium may refer to:
 Singular form of bacteria
 Bacterium (genus)
 Bacterium (film), a 2006 film

See also
 Bacteria (disambiguation)